Elections to Tonbridge and Malling Borough Council were held on 5 May 2011. The whole borough council (53 members) were up for election. Parish council elections and the national Alternative Vote referendum were held on the same day.

Overall results
The Conservatives tightened their grip on the Council by gaining three seats from the Liberal Democrats. They however lost one seat to Labour who now had a presence on the Council after a four-year absence. The leader of the Liberal Democrats David Thornewell lost his seat after 37 years on the Council. Thornewell had been a member of the Council since its creation in 1974. He had also been a member of Malling Rural District Council, one of the Council's predecessors, between 1972 and 1974.

Ward results

References

2011 English local elections
Tonbridge and Malling Borough Council elections
2010s in Kent